Anadia is a municipality in Portugal. The population in 2011 was 29,150, in an area of 216.63 km². It had 26,915 eligible voters. The city of Anadia is part of Arcos e Mogofores parish. The city itself had a population of 3,034 in 2001, while Arcos e Mogofores parish has about 5,000.

History
The history of the municipality is poorly documented before the Roman era, although some vestiges of early Paleolithic (Monte Crasto, Carvalhais and Vila Nova de Monsarros), Neolithic (Moita) and Iron Age (Monte Crasto) artifacts have been studied in this area. But remnants of Roman era artifacts have been isolated in many parts of the municipality, including Aguim, Avelãs de Caminho, Avelãs de Cima, Mogofores, Moita, Óis do Bairro, São Lourenço do Bairro, Vila Nova de Monsarros, Vilarinho do Bairro and, especially, in Anadia (Monte Crasto) and Sangalhos. In addition to domestic ceramic evidence, this early villages in this area existed along the cross roads between the major Roman towns of the time: Olissipo (Lisbon) and Cale (Porto). This continues to be a source of investigation and theories as to the local importance.

Although there may have existed organized communities during this period, it was only during the Medieval Age when documentation began to appear. As such, the villages of São Lourenço do Bairro (883), Arcos (943), Sangalhos (957), Vila Nova de Monsarros (1006), Levira (1020), Vilarinho do Bairro (1020), Samel (1020), Monsarros (1064), Moita (1064), Tamengos (1064), Horta (1064), Anadia (1082), Quintela (1082), Óis do Bairro (1086), Aguim (1101), Mata (1131), Avelãs de Baixo (1132), Figueira (1138), Ferreiros (1138), Ancas (1143), Mogofores (1143), Sá (1143) and Paredes do Bairro (1143), where documented in local land registries and referenced in court records.

With about five centuries of populational existence, the area of Anadia developed over successive mutations in administrative domain. The region, during its formative age, was not developed from the implementation of forals as was the traditional method of instituting land development. But, in the historical Aveiro district on three forals were instituted to promote development: Ferreiros, Fontemanha and Vale de Avim (centers that were part of the older parish of Moita). There have been posterior references to forals conceded in this area (in Avelãs de Caminho, for example), but they were insufficiently explained to indicate that the forals were more than mere local or defensive contracts between the Crown and/or the peoples of the area. Further, there were erroneous references to older forals by contemporary authors, in particular case, the municipalities of Aguim and Anadia. At the beginning of the 16th century, during the administrative reforms of King Manuel I, the king did not forget the coastal central region, and allocated several forals. In 1514, the municipalities of Anadia, Avelãs de Cima, Vilarinho do Bairro, Carvalhais (which included Ferreiros, Fontemanha and Vale de Avim), São Lourenço do Bairro, Aguim, Sangalhos, Pereiro (the parish of Avelãs de Cima), Óis do Bairro, Mogofores, Avelãs de Caminho, Boialvo (parish of Avelãs de Cima) and Vila Nova de Monsarros; in 1519 Paredes do Bairro was granted a writ and then in 1520 forals for Mogofores and Óis do Bairro were established.

Geography and Climate
The municipality of Anadia is located in the Beira Litoral area of the Centro Region, in an area of the Baixo Vouga referred to as the Bairrada, an area traditionally representative of the district of Aveiro. Anadia is situated geographically between the municipalities of Águeda and Oliveira do Bairro (in the north), Mealhada (to the south) and bordered by the municipal borders of Cantanhede (in the west) and Mortágua (in the east).

Climate

Human geography
Anadia is in the heart of Bairrada, a fertile agricultural and viticulture area, which has recently stagnated in terms of population. Anadia municipality has one city: Anadia (which is in the parish of Arcos) and one town: Sangalhos. Curia, a village in Tamengos parish is a popular tourist spa with hotels, restaurants and a park with a lagoon.

Administratively, the municipality is divided into 10 civil parishes (freguesias):
 Amoreira da Gândara, Paredes do Bairro e Ancas
 Arcos e Mogofores
 Avelãs de Caminho
 Avelãs de Cima
 Moita
 Sangalhos
 São Lourenço do Bairro
 Tamengos, Aguim e Óis do Bairro
 Vila Nova de Monsarros
 Vilarinho do Bairro

Notable people 
 António Xavier Machado e Cerveira (1756-1828) a Portuguese Baroque organ builder
 Maria da Conceição Tavares (born 1930) a Portuguese naturalized Brazilian economist
 Beatriz Amélia Alves de Sousa Oliveira Basto da Silva (born 1944) history researcher from Macau
 Paulo Adriano (born 1977) a Portuguese former footballer with 357 club caps
 Nelson Oliveira (born 1989) a Portuguese road racing cyclist

See also
CMS-Helmets

References
Notes

Sources

External links

Photos from Anadia

 
Municipalities of Aveiro District